This is a list of cases reported in volume 92 of United States Reports, decided by the Supreme Court of the United States in 1876, along with two cases from 1875.

Justices of the Supreme Court at the time of 92 U.S. 

The Supreme Court is established by Article III, Section 1 of the Constitution of the United States, which says: "The judicial Power of the United States, shall be vested in one supreme Court . . .". The size of the Court is not specified; the Constitution leaves it to Congress to set the number of justices. Under the Judiciary Act of 1789 Congress originally fixed the number of justices at six (one chief justice and five associate justices). Since 1789 Congress has varied the size of the Court from six to seven, nine, ten, and back to nine justices (always including one chief justice).

When the cases in 92 U.S. were decided the Court comprised the following nine members:

Notable Cases in 92 U.S.

United States v. Reese
United States v. Reese, 92 U.S. 214 (1876), was a voting rights case in which the Supreme Court narrowly construed the 15th Amendment to the United States Constitution, which provides that suffrage for citizens can not be restricted due to race, color, or the individual having previously been a slave. The Court held that the 15th Amendment did not confer the right of suffrage, but only prohibited exclusion on racial grounds from a pre-existing right to vote.

Chy Lung v Freeman
Chy Lung v. Freeman,         92 U.S. 275 (1876), involved 22 women from China, including Chy Lung, among the passengers on the steamer Japan that journeyed from China to San Francisco, arriving in 1875. The immigration commissioner examined the passengers and, acting under a California statute, identified Chy Lung and the others as "lewd and debauched women". The captain detained the women on board. The women obtained a writ of habeas corpus, which led to them being moved into the custody of the Sheriff of San Francisco,  where they stayed awaiting deportation upon the return of Japan, which had already left for China. The women refused to be deported to China and appealed the decision to deport them. The California Supreme Court upheld the constitutionality of the statute that was used to deny them entry, and it upheld their deportation. The women appealed the decision in the US Supreme Court.  The Court decided unanimously in favor of Chy Lung.  It held that the federal government, and not state governments, was in charge of immigration policy and diplomatic relations with other nations; it was not up to California to impose restrictions on Chinese immigration.

United States v. Cruikshank
In United States v. Cruikshank,         92 U.S. 542 (1876), the Court held that the Bill of Rights did not apply to private actors or to state governments despite the adoption of the Fourteenth Amendment.  The decision represented a major blow to federal efforts to protect the civil rights of African Americans.  The case arose from the hotly-disputed 1872 Louisiana gubernatorial election and the subsequent Colfax massacre, in which dozens of black people and three white people were killed. Federal charges were brought against several white insurgents under the Enforcement Act of 1870, which prohibited two or more people from conspiring to deprive anyone of their constitutional rights. Charges included hindering the freedmen's First Amendment right to freely assemble and their Second Amendment right to keep and bear arms.  In his majority opinion, Chief Justice Morrison Waite overturned the convictions of the defendants, holding that the plaintiffs had to rely on state courts for protection. Waite opined that neither the First Amendment nor the Second Amendment applied to the actions of state governments or to individuals, but only to the federal government; also that the Due Process Clause and the Equal Protection Clause of the Fourteenth Amendment applied to the actions of state governments, but not to individuals. The decision left African Americans in the South at the mercy of increasingly hostile state governments dominated by white Democratic legislatures, and allowed groups such as the Ku Klux Klan to continue to use paramilitary force to suppress black voting.

Citation style 

Under the Judiciary Act of 1789 the federal court structure at the time comprised District Courts, which had general trial jurisdiction; Circuit Courts, which had mixed trial and appellate (from the US District Courts) jurisdiction; and the United States Supreme Court, which had appellate jurisdiction over the federal District and Circuit courts—and for certain issues over state courts. The Supreme Court also had limited original jurisdiction (i.e., in which cases could be filed directly with the Supreme Court without first having been heard by a lower federal or state court). There were one or more federal District Courts and/or Circuit Courts in each state, territory, or other geographical region.

Bluebook citation style is used for case names, citations, and jurisdictions.  
 e.g.,"C.C.D.N.J." = United States Circuit Court for the District of New Jersey
 e.g.,"D. Mass." = United States District Court for the District of Massachusetts 
 "E." = Eastern; "M." = Middle; "N." = Northern; "S." = Southern; "W." = Western
 e.g.,"C.C.S.D.N.Y." = United States Circuit Court for the Southern District of New York
 e.g.,"M.D. Ala." = United States District Court for the Middle District of Alabama
 "Ct. Cl." = United States Court of Claims
 The abbreviation of a state's name alone indicates the highest appellate court in that state's judiciary at the time. 
 e.g.,"Pa." = Supreme Court of Pennsylvania
 e.g.,"Me." = Supreme Judicial Court of Maine

List of cases in 92 U.S.

Notes and references

External links
  Case reports in volume 92 from Library of Congress
  Case reports in volume 92 from Court Listener
  Case reports in volume 92 from the Caselaw Access Project of Harvard Law School
  Case reports in volume 92 from Google Scholar
  Case reports in volume 92 from Justia
  Case reports in volume 92 from Open Jurist
 Website of the United States Supreme Court
 United States Courts website about the Supreme Court
 National Archives, Records of the Supreme Court of the United States
 American Bar Association, How Does the Supreme Court Work?
 The Supreme Court Historical Society

1875 in United States case law
1876 in United States case law